Limnichthys is a genus of sandburrowers native to the Indian and Pacific oceans.

Species
There are currently six recognized species in this genus:
 Limnichthys fasciatus Waite, 1904 (Barred sand burrower)
 Limnichthys marisrubri R. Fricke & Golani, 2012
 Limnichthys nitidus J. L. B. Smith, 1958 (Sand submarine)
 Limnichthys orientalis Yoshino, Kon & Okabe, 1999
 Limnichthys polyactis J. S. Nelson, 1978 (Tommyfish)
 Limnichthys rendahli Parrott, 1958

References

 
Marine fish genera
Taxa named by Edgar Ravenswood Waite